Waddle is a surname. Notable people with the surname include:

 Alan Waddle (born 1954), English footballer
 Bryan Waddle (21st century), New Zealand broadcaster
 Chris Waddle (born 1960), English footballer
 Jaylen Waddle (born 1998) American football wide receiver
 Tom Waddle (born 1967), American football wide receiver

See also
 Watle

fr:Waddle